The Climate Change Accountability Act is a Private Member's Bill that was submitted in the 39th, 40th and 41st Canadian Parliaments. It was originally tabled in October 2006 in the House of Commons of Canada as Bill C-377 of the 39th Parliament by Jack Layton, then the leader of the New Democratic Party of Canada (NDP). It passed third reading by a vote of 148 to 116 with the support of caucuses of the Liberal Party of Canada, the Bloc Québécois and the NDP (the Conservative Party of Canada, led by Prime Minister Stephen Harper, voted against it). However, Bill C-377 died as it was still before the Senate when Parliament was dissolved for the 2008 Canadian federal election.

On February 10, 2009, Bruce Hyer, then the New Democrat Deputy Environment Critic and MP for Thunder Bay-Superior North, seconded by Layton, reintroduced it in the 40th Parliament as Bill C-311. It passed 2nd Reading on April 1, 2009, by a vote of 141 to 128, and was sent to the Standing Committee on the Environment and Sustainable Development. On October 21, 2009, the House voted 169 to 93 to allow the Committee more time to study the Bill, as the sixty sitting days permitted for its consideration under Standing Order 97.1(1) of the House of Commons had expired. Passage of the Climate Change Accountability Act was therefore effectively delayed until 2010, meaning it would not influence the government in negotiations at the UN COP15 global climate change treaty negotiations held in December 2009 in Copenhagen. On December 10, 2009, the committee report on Bill C-311 was presented to the House, without amendment to the Bill.

The December 30, 2009 prorogation of the House did not affect the Bill, as Private Member's Bills are reinstated at the stage last completed, and Bill C-311 had not been considered at Report Stage at prorogation. When Parliament resumed, C-311 was concurred in at Report Stage on April 14, 2010, by vote 155 to 137.

The bill was passed by the House of Commons at 3rd Reading on May 5, 2010, with 149 votes for and 136 votes against. It received 1st Reading in the Senate on May 6, 2010, before being defeated at 2nd Reading on November 16, 2010, by a vote of 43 to 32.

The bill was re-introduced as Bill C-224 on June 15, 2011, by current NDP Environment Critic and MP for Halifax, Megan Leslie. The bill was seconded by Deputy Environment Critic Laurin Liu.

Provisions 

The Bill requires that the Canadian federal government set regulations to attain a medium-term target to bring greenhouse gas emissions 25% below 1990 levels by 2020, and a long-term target to bring emissions 80% below 1990 levels by 2050. According to the summary, the purpose of this bill is:

to ensure that Canada meets its global climate change obligations under the United Nations Framework Convention on Climate Change by committing to a long-term target to reduce Canadian greenhouse gas emissions to a level that is 80% below the 1990 level by the year 2050, and by establishing interim targets for the period 2015 to 2045. It creates an obligation on the Commissioner of the Environment and Sustainable Development to review proposed measures to meet the targets and submit a report to Parliament.
It also sets out the duties of the National Round Table on the Environment and the Economy.

The Climate Change Accountability Act is based on the Case for Deep Reductions report by the National Round Table on the Environment and the Economy and on guidelines set by the United Nations Framework Convention on Climate Change. These are the same emissions targets adopted by the European Union and announced as objectives of U.S. President Obama's New Energy For America strategy. The Bill is noteworthy in that it was the first legislation in the world to pass a democratically elected parliament which mandated hard emissions reductions for the post-Kyoto Protocol period (after 2012).

References

External links 
 Bill C-311 First Reading version
 European Union Adopts Climate Change Committee Recommendations
 Obama-Biden New Energy for America Plan

Environmental law in Canada
Proposed laws of Canada
Politics of climate change
Climate change in Canada
Climate change law
2000s in Canada
2010s in Canada
2006 in Canadian law
History of the New Democratic Party (Canada)
2006 in Canadian politics
2009 in Canadian politics
2011 in Canadian politics
39th Canadian Parliament
40th Canadian Parliament
41st Canadian Parliament